Kucchh Pal Saath Tumhara is an Indian television series that aired on Sahara One channel in 2003 until 2004. The series is produced by the popular Bollywood golden era actress, Asha Parekh. The series premiered on 27 June 2003, with the story of Nandini - a traditional Indian woman who stays is torn between tradition and forbidden love.

Overview
The story portrays the life a young woman name Nandini and her hardships of life. Nandini who stays within the parameters of traditional values reaches a stage in her life when she is torn between two men who love her and wish to marry her at different phases of her life. It traces Nandini’s evolution from a meek and submissive widow to a strong woman who questions the norms of society at the crossroads of her life.

Cast
 Sushmita Daan as Nandini Sameer Singh Rana
 Anuj Saxena as Amit
 Akhil Ghai as Amit
 Joy Sengupta as Sameer Singh Rana 
 Manasi Salvi
 Anuj Mathur
 Rajiv Menon
 Rajeev Verma as Samresh Singh Rana
 S. M. Zaheer
 Amita Nangia
 Uttara Baokar

References

External links
 

Sahara One original programming
Indian television soap operas
Indian drama television series
2003 Indian television series debuts